Rabbi Dr. Sharon (Zewde) Shalom (born in Ethiopia, 1973) is a rabbi, lecturer and Jewish author. He is a Rav of one of the Tzohar "Open Communities" in Kiryat Gat. He was born Zaude Tesfay in a Jewish community in the North of Ethiopia. He works as a Rabbi in the Merkaz Shapira Or Meofir special program for Ethiopian emigrants. He lectures in Jewish ritual and tradition at Ono Academic College in Israel, and wrote From Sinai to Ethiopia: the Halachic World and Ethiopian Jewish Thought.

Early life 
Sharon Shalom grew up in a small Jewish village located in the North of Ethiopia. Twenty Jewish families lived together separately from the Christian population surrounding them.

He listened to his grandfather that God would one day rejoin Jews around the world. This biblical promise led him and a friend to leave the village to move to Jerusalem at age seven. They got lost and returned home.

Jerusalem 
When the Ethiopian Civil War erupted he found another opportunity to move to Jerusalem. Israel's parliament led by Menachem Begin passed a law committing Israel to give receive Jews of Ethiopia.

When he was eight his mother sent him to join a group of Jewish refugees leaving for Israel.

One year after arriving in Israel Shalom was misinformed that his family had died in Ethiopia. However two years later they arrived in Israel.

Career 
Shalom served as an officer in the Israel Defense Forces. After that he enrolled at Yeshivat Har Etzion where he was a student of the Roshei Yeshiva, Rabbis Aharon Lichtenstein and Yehuda Amital and the Rosh Kollel, Rabbi Shlomo Levy. He was ordained as a Rabbi in 2001. At Bar Ilan University he completed a doctorate in Jewish philosophy.

In 2012, he published From Sinai to Ethiopia: The Halachic World and Ethiopian Jewish Thought. He has called to stop racism against Ethiopian Jews in Israel.

He is also the author of Dialogues of Love and Fear, published in 2021.

Personal life 
Sharon Shalom is married to Avital, a Swiss-born social worker and art therapist. They live in the southern Israeli city of Kiryat Gat with their five children, Roi, Nadav, Ziv, Gil, and Tohar.

References 

Israeli Orthodox rabbis
Ethiopian emigrants to Israel
Bar-Ilan University alumni
Ethiopian rabbis
1973 births
Living people
Yeshivat Har Etzion
Academic staff of Bar-Ilan University